The surname Petrus may refer to:
 Annick Petrus (born 1961), French Saint Martinois politician
 Brent Petrus (born 1975), American football player
 Jacques Fred Petrus (1948-1987), French-Italian business man
 Junauda Petrus (born 1981), American author and performance artist
 Lars Petrus (born 1960), Swedish speedcuber and inventor of the Petrus method
 Mitch Petrus (1987–2019), American football player